Castrocaro Terme e Terra del Sole ( or ) is a comune (municipality) in the Province of Forlì-Cesena in the Italian region Emilia-Romagna, located about  southeast of Bologna and about  southwest of Forlì.

The comune consists of three small towns: Castrocaro, Terra del Sole and Pieve Salutare. Terra del Sole, founded as a 16th-century fortress by Cosimo I de' Medici, is believed to occupy the site of the ancient city of Solona, which lends its name to the town Terra del Sole.

Castrocaro Terme e Terra del Sole borders the following municipalities: Brisighella, Dovadola, Forlì, Modigliana, Predappio.

Castrocaro is home to a spa. It is also the seat of the Castrocaro Music Festival, featuring new singers.

See also
Terra del Sole

References

External links

 Official website

Cities and towns in Emilia-Romagna
Spa towns in Italy